Eddy Berdusco (born 8 September 1969) is a Canadian retired professional soccer player. A former forward, he began his career in the Canadian Soccer League, where he finished as the third all-time highest goalscorer. After the demise of the CSL he spent some time abroad in Europe, China, before returning to North America to play with the Milwaukee Rampage. Berdusco would spend the remainder of his career in the Canadian Professional Soccer League, winning several team championships with the Toronto Olympians, and retiring with the Toronto Supra in 2002.

Berdusco also played internationally for Canada and scored one of its most memorable goals in a friendly against Brazil in 1994.

Club career
The son of Italian immigrants, Berdusco was the original Canadian Soccer League's 3rd all-time highest goal scorer with 54 from 1988 through 1992 as a member of North York Rockets. In 1988, he was the league's 5th leading scorer with 11 goals, in 1990 the 6th leading scorer with 9 goals, in 1991 the league's 2nd leading scorer with 14 goals, and in the league's final season he led in scoring with 14 goals. After the folding of the CSL he signed with the Toronto Blizzard of the American Professional Soccer League in 1993. He made his debut for the club on 23 May 1993 in a match against the Tampa Bay Rowdies. After the Blizzard failed to reach the postseason, he went abroad to Europe to sign with FC Wil in Switzerland, and had a short spell in Austria, playing three matches in November 1994 for VfB Mödling. After his tenure in Europe he came to a conclusion to go to China to play in the Jia League with now defunct Foshan Fosti F.C. (along with fellow Canadian international Ian Carter) in 1994.

In the summer of the 1994 Berdusco returned to the APSL to sign with the Toronto Rockets. He made his debut for the organization on 9 September 1994 in a match against the Colorado Foxes, and managed to score a goal in his debut match. In 1996, he signed with the Montreal Impact, and finished the A-League as the sixth leading scorer with 19 points (on 8 goals and 3 assists), and managed to win the regular season championship In the winter of 1996 he played indoor with the Toronto Shooting Stars of the National Professional Soccer League. The following season, he signed with the Milwaukee Rampage for the 1997 season where unfortunately the organization failed to obtain him a valid work permit which resulted in five-year ban from entering the United States.

In 1998, Berdusco signed with the Toronto Olympians in the newly formed Canadian Professional Soccer League. In his debut season in the CPSL he helped the Olympians achieve an undefeated season, and claim the CPSL League Cup. In the finals against the St. Catharines Wolves he scored a goal in a 3–0 victory. He assisted in the Olympians reaching the playoff finals where the team suffered an upset loss to St. Catharines in a 4–2 loss on a penalty shootout. The following season, he repeated Toronto's undefeated season and achieved a treble – the first CPSL club to record this milestone. At the end of the season he was awarded the CPSL Golden Boot for finishing as the league's top goalscorer. In 2000, the Olympians defended their regular-season championship, and League Cup, but were defeated by Toronto Croatia in the CPSL Championship final. For the 2001 season he featured less throughout the year due to injuries, and the club failed to secure any piece of silverware.

On 7 May 2002, Toronto Supra announced the signing of Berdusco for the 2002 season. Due to injuries, suspensions, and family responsibilities, Berdusco made only occasional appearances for the club and retired at the conclusion of the season.

International career
He made his debut for Canada in a June 1992 Columbus 500 Cup match against Hong Kong in which he immediately scored his first international goal. He went on to earn a total of 18 caps, scoring 4 goals. He represented Canada in only 2 FIFA World Cup qualification matches. He also played at the inaugural 1989 FIFA Futsal World Championship.

Berdusco is famous in Canada for being the player who scored the equaliser against mighty Brazil to secure the Canadians a 1–1 draw in a 1994 World Cup tune-up match played at Commonwealth Stadium. A month later, Brazil became World Champions.

His final international was a November 1997 World Cup qualification match against Costa Rica, a game after which also Alex Bunbury, Frank Yallop, Paul Dolan, Geoff Aunger and Colin Miller all said farewell to the national team.

International goals
Scores and results list Canada's goal tally first.

Honors

Club
Toronto Olympians
CPSL Championship (1) 1999
Open Canada Cup (3): 1998, 1999, 2000
Canadian Professional Soccer League Regular Season Champions (3): 1998, 1999, 2000

Individual
CSL Golden Boot (1): 1999

References

External links
 
 
 1993 A-League stats – A-League archive

1969 births
Living people
Soccer players from Mississauga
Canadian sportspeople of Italian descent
Association football forwards
Canadian soccer players
Canada men's youth international soccer players
Canada men's under-23 international soccer players
Canada men's international soccer players
Canadian expatriate soccer players
Canadian expatriate sportspeople in Switzerland
Canadian expatriate sportspeople in Austria
Canadian expatriates in China
Canadian expatriate sportspeople in the United States
North York Rockets players
Toronto Blizzard (1986–1993) players
Toronto (Mississauga) Olympians players
Toronto Rockets players
FC Wil players
FC Admira Wacker Mödling players
Montreal Impact (1992–2011) players
Milwaukee Rampage players
Canadian Soccer League (1987–1992) players
American Professional Soccer League players
Austrian Football Bundesliga players
Canadian Soccer League (1998–present) players
A-League (1995–2004) players
Expatriate footballers in Switzerland
Expatriate footballers in Austria
Expatriate footballers in China
Expatriate soccer players in the United States
SC Toronto players
1993 CONCACAF Gold Cup players
Toronto Shooting Stars players
National Professional Soccer League (1984–2001) players
Foshan Fosti F.C. players